The 1987 NCAA Division I Cross Country Championships were the 49th annual NCAA Men's Division I Cross Country Championship and the 7th annual NCAA Women's Division I Cross Country Championship to determine the team and individual national champions of NCAA Division I men's and women's collegiate cross country running in the United States. In all, four different titles were contested: men's and women's individual and team championships.

Held on November 23, 1987, the combined meet was hosted by the University of Virginia at the Foxfield Course in Charlottesville, Virginia. The distance for the men's race was 10 kilometers (6.21 miles) while the distance for the women's race was 5 kilometers (3.11 miles).

The men's team national championship was won by Arkansas, their third national title. The individual championship was won by Joe Falcon, also from Arkansas, with a time of 29:14.97.

The women's team national championship was won by Oregon, their second national title. The individual championship was won by Kimberly Betz, from Indiana, with a then-event record time of 16:10.85.

Qualification
All Division I cross country teams were eligible to qualify for the meet through their placement at various regional qualifying meets. In total, 22 teams and 180 runners contested the men's championship while 16 teams and 134 runners contested the women's title.

Men's title
Distance: 10,000 meters (6.21 miles)

Men's Team Result (Top 10)

Men's Individual Result (Top 10)

Women's title
Distance: 5,000 meters (3.11 miles)

Women's Team Result (Top 10)

Women's Individual Result (Top 10)

See also
NCAA Men's Cross Country Championships (Division II, Division III)
NCAA Women's Cross Country Championships (Division II, Division III)

References
 

NCAA Cross Country Championships
NCAA Division I Cross Country Championships
NCAA Division I Cross Country Championships
NCAA Division I Cross Country Championships
Charlottesville, Virginia
Track and field in Virginia
University of Virginia